Guilford Township is a township in Wilson County, Kansas, United States.

History
Guilford Township was created in 1868. It was named after Guilford, New York.

References

Townships in Wilson County, Kansas
Townships in Kansas